Mahan (foaled 1951 in England) was a Thoroughbred racehorse who competed successfully in France for his American owner/breeder Ralph B. Strassburger before being sold to  Allie E. Reuben's Hasty House Farm and brought to race in the United States.

 
Trained by U.S. Racing Hall of Fame inductee Harry Trotsek, Mahan defeated the great Swaps to win the Arch Ward Handicap at Washington Park Race Track in Chicago.

In 1957, Mahan won the most important race of his career when he captured  the Washington, D.C. International Stakes, a race that was the precursor to the Breeders' Cup.

Mahan was not successful at stud.

References

1951 racehorse births
Thoroughbred family 13-c
Racehorses bred in the United Kingdom
Racehorses trained in France
Racehorses trained in the United States